P. Diddy's Starmaker is an American reality television singing competition show that aired for one season on MTV in 2009. Kimberly Caldwell was the host, with P. Diddy, Rodney Jerkins, Tamara Conniff, and Laurie Ann Gibson as the judges.

Performances

Week 1
 Todd Sarvies - "I Write Sins Not Tragedies" by Panic! at the Disco
 Lauriana Mae - "Mercy" by Duffy
 David Bennett - "I Don't Want to Be" by Gavin DeGraw
 Angel Inez - "Love" by Keyshia Cole
 Jordan Battiste - "Forever" by Chris Brown
 Marissa Shipp - "Bleeding Love" by Leona Lewis
 Christopher John - "Your Body Is a Wonderland" by John Mayer
 Zach Berkman - "Clocks" by Coldplay
 Lauren Thomas - "Don't Cha" by The Pussycat Dolls
 David Joseph - "Viva la Vida" by Coldplay
 Monet Monico - "Complicated" by Avril Lavigne
 Melody Angel - "So What" by Pink
 Omotayo Riley - "Buy U a Drank (Shawty Snappin')" by T-Pain
 Liz Davis - "Gunpowder & Lead" by Miranda Lambert

Week 2
 Monet Monico - "Hot n Cold" by Katy Perry
 Angel Inez - "Spotlight" by Jennifer Hudson
 Marissa Shipp - "7 Things" by Miley Cyrus
 Melody Angel - "Because of You" by Kelly Clarkson
 Liz Davis - "Material Girl" by Madonna
 Lauriana Mae - "Better in Time" by Leona Lewis

Week 3
 David Bennett - "Burnin' Up" by Jonas Brothers
 Omotayo Riley - "Superstition" by Stevie Wonder
 Jordan Battiste - "Let It Rock" by Kevin Rudolf
 Zach Berkman - "Stop and Stare" by OneRepublic
 Christopher John - "Leavin'" by Jesse McCartney
 Todd Sarvies - "I Don't Care" by Fall Out Boy

Week 4
 Angel Inez - "Crazy In Love" by Beyoncé
 Monet Monico - "No One" by Alicia Keys
 Lauriana Mae - "Rehab" by Amy Winehouse
 Melody Angel - "Since You Been Gone" by Kelly Clarkson
 Liz Davis- "Last Name" by Carrie Underwood

Week 5
 Christopher John - "Magic" by Robin Thicke
 Omotayo Riley - "American Woman" by Lenny Kravitz
 Todd Sarvies - "Move Along" by All American Rejects
 Jordan Battiste - "I'm Yours" by Jason Mraz
 David Bennett - "Never" by David Bennett (Original)

Week 6
 Monet Monico - "U + Ur Hand" by Pink
 Todd Sarvies - "Yellow" by Coldplay
 Lauriana Mae - "Unwritten" by Natasha Bedingfield
 Christopher John - "Higher Ground" by Stevie Wonder
 Liz Davis- "Big Girls Don't Cry" by Fergie
 Omotayo Riley - "Irreplaceable" by Beyoncé
 Melody Angel - "Lucky" by Melody Angel (Original)
 David Bennett - "Instant Karma" by John Lennon

Week 7
 Liz Davis- "Girlfriend" by Avril Lavigne
Omotayo Riley - "Every Breath You Take" by The Police
Monet Monico - "Just Dance" by Lady Gaga
David Bennet - "Call Me" by Blondie
Melody Angel - "It's Not Over" by Daughtry
Todd Sarvies - "Thnks Fr Th Mmrs" by Fall Out Boy
Lauriana Mae - "Love, Traitors and Fate" by Lauriana Mae (Original)

Week 8
 Liz Davis - "Before He Cheats" by Carrie Underwood
Monet Monico - "Dirty Little Secret" by All American Rejects
Melody Angel - "Just Like a Pill" by Pink
Omotayo Riley - "Moving Mountains" by Usher
Todd Sarvies - "Flatline" by Todd Sarvies (Original)
Lauriana Mae - "If I Ain't Got You" by Alicia Keys

Week 9
Todd Sarvies - "Ready, Set, Go!" by Tokio Hotel
Melody Angel - "How to Save a Life" by The Fray
Lauriana Mae - "Chasing Pavements" by Adele
 Liz Davis - "Here for the Party" by Gretchen Wilson

Week 10
 Liz Davis - "Redneck Woman" by Gretchen Wilson
Melody Angel - "If I Were a Boy" by Beyoncé
Todd Sarvies - "Fix You" by Coldplay

Contestants
 Liz Davis, Nashville, Tennessee
Todd Sarvies, St. Louis, Missouri
Melody Angel, Chicago Heights, Illinois
Lauriana Mae, Keyport, New Jersey
Monet Monico, Westlake Village, California
Omotayo Phaniel Riley, Brooklyn, New York
David Bennet, Los Angeles, California
Christopher John, Sacramento, California
Jordan Battiste, Queens, New York
Angel Inez, Newark, New Jersey
Zach Berkman, Peoria, Illinois
Marissa Shipp, Phoenix, Arizona
Lauren Thomas, O'Fallon, Missouri
David Joseph, East Haven, Connecticut

Episode progress

 The contestant won P. Diddy's Starmaker.
 The contestant was one of the top performances of the night.
 The contestant did not perform that night.
 The contestant was in the bottom two.
 The contestant was eliminated.

 The contestant is male.
 The contestant is female.

Guests
 Guest Photographer Kevin Ou

References

External links
Official Website
 

2000s American music television series
2009 American television series debuts
2009 American television series endings
2000s American reality television series
Singing talent shows
MTV original programming